70 Years of Hits is a compilation album by Frankie Yankovic, released through Our Heritage Records in 1985. The title refers to Yankovic having turned 70 years old that year. In 1986, the album won Yankovic the Grammy Award for Best Polka Recording.

Track listing

Personnel

 Michael Bishop – mastering
 Dorothy Hock – vocals
 William Lausche – composer
 Joey Miskulin – arranger, musician, producer, vocals
 Steve Popovich – executive producer
 Gary Rhamy – engineer
 Leo Robin – composer

 Bob Shelton – composer
 Joe Shelton – composer
 Larry Sintic – musician
 Ron Sluga – musician
 Dave Wolnick – musician
 Frankie Yankovic – accordion, composer, musician, vocals
 Robert Yankovic – musician

See also
 Polka in the United States

References

1985 compilation albums
Polka albums
Grammy Award for Best Polka Album